Vaudreuil station is a commuter rail station operated by Exo in Vaudreuil-Dorion, Quebec, Canada. It is served by the Vaudreuil–Hudson line.

 on weekdays, 10 of 11 inbound trains originate at this station, and 11 of 12 outbound trains on the line terminate here, the exception being one short-turned train in each direction terminating or originating at Beaconsfield station. On weekends, all trains (four on Saturday and three on Sunday in each direction) originate or terminate here.

The station is a recent addition to the line, built in 2003. It is located near the interchange of Autoroute 40 and Autoroute 30, on Boulevard de la Gare, and is surrounded by new development that followed its construction. The station was originally built as a single-track, single-platform station. In 2019, as part of a large-scale renovation, a second platform was added to the other side of the single track so that passengers can embark and alight on either side of the train, saving them from having to cross the track.

The renovation also included the construction of a passenger service centre, permanent bus shelters, more parking spaces, and bicycle facilities. The new constructions were built in a modernist style inspired by the International Style of Ludwig Mies van der Rohe. The renovation also added a work of public art, making Vaudreuil only the second station on the line to have one: a coloured mural printed on glass by Marianne Chevalier, entitled De verts et de vents. It is located on the façade of the service centre.

Bus connections

CIT La Presqu'Île

STSV

References

External links
 Vaudreuil Commuter Train Station Information (Exo)
 Vaudreuil  Commuter Train Station Schedule (Exo)

Exo commuter rail stations
Vaudreuil-Dorion
Railway stations in Montérégie
Railway stations in Canada opened in 2003